The following is a list of notable performers of rock and roll music or rock music, and others directly associated with the music as producers, songwriters or in other closely related roles, who died in the 2010s decade. The list gives their date, cause and location of death, and their age.

Rock music developed from the rock and roll music that emerged during the 1950s, and includes a diverse range of subgenres. The terms "rock and roll" and "rock" each have a variety of definitions, some narrow and some wider. In determining criteria for inclusion, this list uses as its basis reliable sources listing "rock deaths" or "deaths in rock and roll", as well as such sources as the Rock and Roll Hall of Fame.

2010

2011

2012

2013

2014

2015

2016

2017

2018

2019

See also

 27 Club
 List of murdered hip hop musicians
List of deaths in rock and roll (1950s)
List of deaths in rock and roll (1960s)
List of deaths in rock and roll (1970s)
List of deaths in rock and roll (1980s)
List of deaths in rock and roll (1990s)
List of deaths in rock and roll (2000s)
List of deaths in rock and roll (2020s)

References

External links
 The Dead Rock Stars Club
 Youngest Rock Star Deaths

Deaths in rock and roll
Deaths in rock and roll

Rock and roll, 2010s
2010s deaths in rock and roll

Deaths